Tilt is a topical British radio sketch show, written in the week before broadcast, and recorded the night before.  The first, six episode series was broadcast on BBC 7, between 27 March – 1 May 2008, one of their growing number of specially commissioned projects.  

It is written by a variety of sketch writers, some of whom (like Carrie Quinlan) are known writers and performers, who have worked on Armando Iannucci's Charm Offensive and other established comedy programmes; others are complete novices, who have submitted their work in answer to an invitation to new writers in the BBC writersroom.

See also
Newsjack

References

External links

BBC Radio comedy programmes
Satirical radio programmes
British radio sketch shows
British satirical radio programmes
2008 radio programme debuts
BBC Radio 7 (rebranded) programmes